A special election was held in  on January 7, 1793, to fill a vacancy left by the resignation of Joshua Seney (A) on December 6, 1792, to accept a judicial appointment.

Election results

Hindman took his seat on January 30, 1793.

See also
List of special elections to the United States House of Representatives

References

Maryland 1793 02
Maryland 1793 02
1793 02
Maryland 02
United States House of Representatives 02
United States House of Representatives 1793 02